= Bundrkha Sadak =

Badarkha Sadak
- village
- Location within Madhya Pradesh Location within India
- Coordinates: 23.3234404°N 77.2890015°E
- Country: India
- State: Madhya Pradesh
- District: Bhopal
- Tehsil: Huzur
- Elevation: 511 m (1,677 ft)

Population (2011)
  - Total: 386
- Time zone: UTC+5:30 (IST)
- ISO 3166 code: MP-IN
- 2011 census code: 482353

Badarkha Sadak is a village in the Bhopal district of Madhya Pradesh, India. It is located in the Huzur tehsil and the Phanda block.

== Demographics ==
According to the 2011 census of India, Bundrkha Sadak has 77 households. The effective literacy rate (i.e. the literacy rate of population excluding children aged 6 and below) is 79.36%.

Demographics (2011 Census)
	Total	Male	Female
Population	386	218	168
Children aged below 6 years	42	27	15
Scheduled caste	8	4	4
Scheduled tribe	0	0	0
Literates	273	175	98
Workers (all)	206	108	98
Main workers (total)	206	108	98
Main workers: Cultivators	134	76	58
Main workers: Agricultural labourers	70	31	39
Main workers: Household industry workers	1	0	1
Main workers: Other	1	1	0
Marginal workers (total)	0	0	0
Marginal workers: Cultivators	0	0	0
Marginal workers: Agricultural labourers	0	0	0
Marginal workers: Household industry workers	0	0	0
Marginal workers: Others	0	0	0
Non-workers	180	110	70
